Moser is a South German topographic surname coming from 'Moos'. Notable people with the surname include:
 Aldo Moser (1934–2020), Italian racing cyclist
 Ana Beatriz Moser (born 1968), Brazilian former volleyball player
 Ann B. Moser (born 1940), American biochemist
 Angelica Moser, Swiss pole vaulter
 Annemarie Moser-Pröll (born 1953), Austrian skier
 Barry Moser (born 1940), American illustrator
 Benjamin Moser, (born 1976), American columnist and author
 Caroline Moser English urban anthropologist
 Christian Moser (ski jumper) (born 1972), Austrian ski jumper
 Christian Moser (mathematician) (1861–1935), Swiss actuary and mathematician
 Chuck Moser (1918–1995), American football coach
 Claus Moser (1922–2015), statistician
 Edda Moser (born 1938), German soprano
 Edvard Moser, Norwegian neuroscientist
 Edward W. Moser (1924–1976), American linguist
 Elfriede Moser-Rath (1926–1993), German ethnologist and folklorist
 Enzo Moser (1940-2008), Italian cyclist
 Fanny Moser (scientist) (1872-1953), Swiss-German zoologist
 Francesco Moser (born 1951), Italian cyclist
 Franziska Rochat-Moser (1966–2002), Swiss long-distance runner
 Fred J. Moser (1898-1993), American politician
 Gabriela Moser (1954–2019), Austrian politician
 Georg Moser (1923–1988), German catholic bishop
 George Michael Moser (1706–1783), English enameller
 Hans Moser (actor) (1880–1964), Austrian actor
 Hans Moser (director) (born 1944), German director of pornographic films
 Hans Moser (rider) (1901–1974), Swiss Olympic equestrian
 Hans Heinz Moser (1936–2017), Swiss actor
 Hans Joachim Moser (1889–1967), German composer and musicologist
 Ignazio Moser (born 1992), Italian cyclist
 Johann Jakob Moser (1701–1785), German jurist
 Johannes Moser, German ethnologist
 Johannes Moser (born 1979), German-Canadian cellist
 Josef Moser (entomologist) (1861–1944) Austrian priest and entomologist
 Jürgen Moser (1928–1999), mathematician (Kolmogorov-Arnold-Moser theorem)
 J.J. Moser (born 2000), Swiss ice hockey player
 Karl Moser  (1860–1936), Swiss architect
 Kimberly Poore Moser (born 1962), American politician
 Koloman Moser (1868–1918), Austrian artist
 Leo Moser (1921–1970), mathematician (Moser polygon notation)
 Leon Moser (1942–1995), American murderer
 Lisa-Maria Moser (born 1991), Austrian tennis player
 Margaret Moser (1954-2017), American music critic, groupie and journalist
 Mary Moser (1744–1819), English painter
 Mary B. Moser (1924–2013), American linguist
 May-Britt Moser (born 1963), Norwegian neuroscientist
 Meinhard Michael Moser (1924–2002), Austrian mycologist
 Mike Moser (born 1990), American basketball player
 Moreno Moser (born 1990), Italian cyclist
 Nikolaus Moser, Austrian tennis player
 Otto von Moser German general of the First World War
 Porter Moser (born 1968), American basketball coach
 Rudolph Moser, German musician
 Sandra Moser (born 1969), Swiss actress
 Silvio Moser (1941–1974), Swiss racing driver
 Simon Moser, Swiss ice hockey player
 Willy Moser (1941–1994), Austrian-born Italian voice actor

Surnames
German-language surnames
Surnames of German origin
Surnames of Italian origin
Surnames of Swiss origin
German toponymic surnames
Surnames of South Tyrolean origin